Female Fugitive (aka Nu Tao Fan, Queen of Opium, and Raachínee Fìn) is a 1975 Hong Kong action film from actress-turned-directed Kao Pao-shu.

The film—which centers on drug trafficking in Hong Kong—was released in the U.S. with subtitles in 1976. In addition to directing and co-writing the film, Kao Pao-shu also acted in the film.

References

1975 films